Fly Gangwon is a South Korean low cost airline startup which was founded in 2016 and made its maiden flight on 22 November 2019 from Yangyang to Jeju.  The company slogan is Fly To Your Dream.

Destinations

Fleet

Current fleet
, Fly Gangwon consist of following aircraft:

References

Airlines of South Korea
Low-cost carriers
Airlines established in 2016
South Korean companies established in 2016